The Lancair Evolution is an American pressurized, low wing, four-place, single engine light aircraft, made from carbon fiber composite, developed by  Lancair and supplied as an amateur-built kit by Evolution Aircraft.

The Evolution can be powered by a Lycoming TEO-540-A piston engine or a Pratt & Whitney PT6-135A turboprop powerplant.

Development
The Evolution was designed to meet the same FAR Part 23 aircraft certification standards that type certified aircraft comply with. The kit includes energy absorbing seats.

The first customer kit was delivered on 22 July 2008, and production was planned at that time for two kits per month. By December 2011, one piston model and 15 turbine models had been completed and flown. Construction time from the supplied kit is estimated as 1000 hours.

In April 2017, the manufacturer announced new turboprop engine options for the design.

The manufacturer issued a statement on 5 October 2017 indicating that they were going through a restructuring and had laid off 22 of its 49 employees on 3 October 2017. The Aircraft Owners and Pilots Association reported on 19 October 2017 that the company was apparently out of business, citing inability to obtain product liability insurance following a fatal accident. On 26 October 2017, Aero News Network reported that the company was "for sale. And while reports last week of the company being closed appeared to be premature, the kit maker is certainly struggling" and seeking a buyer. ANN reported also that the company has been unable to obtain insurance due to high-profile accidents. On 4 November 2017, the company indicated in an interview in The Bend Bulletin, that they were still in limited operations, "focused on fulfilling customer commitments" and were seeking investors. On 22 May 2018, Flying reported that the company had shut down, but that an unrelated company, Elite Pilot Services, was providing owners with technical support.

Specifications (Evolution with PT6)

See also
Related Aircraft
 Lancair Propjet
 Lancair IV-P

References

External links

Official website
Lancair Evolution video
Lancair Evolution First Flight video
Lancair Evolution prototype at Airventure 2008.

Evolution
Evolution
Homebuilt aircraft
Single-engined tractor aircraft
Low-wing aircraft
Aircraft first flown in 2008